Bjørkelangen Videregående Skole is located in the town of Bjørkelangen in Aurskog-Høland municipality in Norway. It is a college with approximately 650 students.

It offers the following study focus areas: General high school education, business and administration, sales and service, health and social, mechanical studies, arts, and sports studies.

References

External links 
 Official Webpage

Secondary schools in Norway
Akershus County Municipality
Education in Viken (county)